Corpen Aike Department is a department in Santa Cruz Province, Argentina. It has a population of 7,942 (2001) and an area of 26,350 km². The seat of the department is in Puerto Santa Cruz.

Municipalities
Comandante Luis Piedrabuena
Puerto Santa Cruz
Puerto de Punta Quilla
Río Chico

References
Instituto Nacional de Estadísticas y Censos, INDEC

Departments of Santa Cruz Province, Argentina